Asplenium marinum is a fern known as the sea spleenwort because of its preference for maritime habitats. Located around the coasts of Europe from Italy in the South to Norway in the North, its most Southern distribution extends to the Northern islands of Tunisia (Galitte islands).

Linnaeus was the first to describe sea spleenwort with the binomial Asplenium marinum in his Species Plantarum of 1753.

References

External links
 
 

marinum
Plants described in 1753
Ferns of Europe
Taxa named by Carl Linnaeus